Richard Buckley (1948 – September 19, 2021) was an American fashion journalist and editor. Buckley wrote for Vogue Italia and New York magazine, and worked as an editor for Women's Wear Daily, Vanity Fair, and Vogue Hommes, the latter of which he was editor-in-chief from 1999 to 2005.

Buckley was born in Binghamton, New York, and was educated at the University of Maryland's Munich campus. He was the husband of designer Tom Ford; they had a son, born in 2012 via gestational surrogacy. 

Buckley died at his home in Los Angeles after an extended illness on September 19, 2021, at the age of 72.

References

1948 births
2021 deaths
20th-century American journalists
21st-century American journalists
American fashion journalists
American magazine editors
Gay journalists
American LGBT journalists
LGBT people from New York (state)
Tom Ford
University of Maryland Global Campus alumni
Writers from Binghamton, New York
Vogue (magazine) editors